The King's Affection, is a 2021 South Korean television series starring Park Eun-bin, Rowoon, Nam Yoon-su, Choi Byung-chan, Bae Yoon-kyung, and Jung Chae-yeon. The story is based on Lee So-young's manhwa Yeonmo. It aired on KBS2 from October 11 to December 14, 2021, every Monday and Tuesday at 21:30 (KST) for 20 episodes. It also premiered worldwide on Netflix on the same day.

The King's Affection is the first South Korean television series to win an International Emmy Award.

Synopsis
The story is set during the Joseon dynasty, at a time when twins were considered an ominous sign. As a result, when the Crown Princess gives birth to twins, an order is sent to kill the daughter. To save her, she is secretly sent out of the palace.

A few years later, the twin daughter, Dam-yi, returns to the palace to work as a maid. When the male twin, Crown Prince Lee Hwi, discovers her, he convinces her to switch places with him time to time but suddenly loses his life through a case of mistaken identity.
Their mother realizes the court maid Dam-yi is her twin daughter and persuades her to take Lee Hwi's place. Although she distances herself from everybody over the years, Lee Hwi (Dam-yi) starts developing feelings again for her original first love, Jung Ji-woon, who is from a noble family. Her court life becomes complicated when Jung Ji-Woon becomes her royal tutor and later a court scribe, while he himself also gets confused feelings about the Lee Hwi, not knowing it's actually his first love, Dam-yi.

Cast

Main
 Park Eun-bin as Crown Prince Lee Hwi / Dam-yi / Yeon-seon
 Choi Myung-bin as young Crown Prince Lee Hwi / Dam-yi / Yeon-seon
 Lee Hwi is a young prince who dies due to a case of mistaken identity. Dam-yi is Lee Hwi's twin sister, who was hidden after birth; she is forced to take the title and responsibility of the Crown Prince due to her brother's death.
 Rowoon as Jung Ji-woon
 Go Woo-rim as young Jung Ji-woon
 Inspector Jung's son. He is a physician at Samgaebang, but is later hired as a Royal Tutor for Crown Prince Lee Hwi.
 Nam Yoon-su as Lee Hyun, Prince Jaeun
 Choi Ro-woon as young Lee Hyun
Lee Hwi's paternal cousin who is soft-hearted and loyal to her.
 Choi Byung-chan as Kim Ga-on / Kang Eun-seo
 Ok Chan-yu as young Kim Ga-on / Kang Eun-seo
 Lee Hwi's personal bodyguard.
 Bae Yoon-kyung as Shin So-eun
 Only child of the Minister of Personnel.
 Jung Chae-yeon as Noh Ha-kyung
 Youngest daughter of the Minister of Military Affairs.

Supporting
 Yoon Je-moon as Han Ki-jae, Lord Sangheon
 Left State Councillor and Lee Hwi's powerful maternal grandfather.
 Bae Soo-bin as Inspector Jung Seok-jo
 Jung Ji-woon's father and right-hand man of Lord Sangheon.
 Lee Pil-mo as King Hyejong
 Father of Dam-yi and Lee Hwi.

People around Lee Hwi
 Baek Hyun-joo as Court Lady Kim
 Lee Hwi's mother figure who knows about her secret.
 Ko Kyu-pil as Eunuch Hong
 Kim Gun as young Eunuch Hong
 Close aide of Dam-yi after she took over her brother's identity, and the late Lee Hwi's childhood playmate.
 Kim Jae-cheol as Commander Yoon Hyeong-seol
 King Hyejong's bodyguard who saved Dam-yi after her birth.

People around Jung Ji-woon
 Park Eun-hye as Madam Kim
 Jung Ji-woon's mother.
 Jang Se-hyun as Bang Jil-geum
 Worker at Samgaebang.
 Lee Soo-min as Bang Young-ji
 Worker at Samgaebang.
 Heo Jung-min as Palace Guard Gu

Royal Family
 Kim Taek as Lee Jeong, Prince Wonsan
 Kim Joon-ho as young Prince Wonsan
 Lee Hyun's older brother and Lee Hwi's paternal cousin.
 Kim Seo-ha as Prince Changwoon
 Lee Hwi's paternal uncle who is always causing trouble.
 Lee Il-hwa as Queen Dowager
 Lee Hwi's paternal grandmother.
 Son Yeo-eun as Queen
 King Hyejong's second wife, the mother of Grand Prince Jehyeon and Lee Hwi's step-mother.
 Cha Sung-jae as Lee Gyeom, Grand Prince Jehyeon
 Lee Hwi's half-brother.

Royal Court
 Jung Jae-seong as Noh Hak-su
 Noh Ha-kyung's father and the Minister of Military Affairs.
 Park Won-sang as Shin Young-soo
 Shin So-eun's father and the Minister of Personnel who is a loyal subject of the King.
 Son Jong-hak as Lord Changchun
 Chief State Councillor and the Queen's father.

Royal Institute
 Kim In-kwon as Yang Moon-soo
 Noh Sang-bo as Park Beom-du
 Kim Min-seok as Choi Man-dal

Others
 Han Chae-ah as Crown Princess Han
 Lord Sangheon's daughter and the mother of Dam-yi and Lee Hwi.
 Park Ki-woong as Chief Eunuch and envoy from the Ming dynasty
 Kim Do-won as young Chief Eunuch
 Lee Seo-hwan as Vice Minister of Rites from the Ming dynasty
 Han Sung-yun as Yu-gon
 A palace maid.
 Gong Jin-seo as Jan-yi
 Shin So-eun's maid.
 Kim Eun-min as Joseon-born concubine of the Ming Emperor
 Yoon Seo-yeon as young concubine
 Jo Sung-kyu as Prince Changwoon's steward
 Kim Ki-doo as Head of the Bureau of Astrology

Production
The manhwa hypothesized the existence of a fictional king between Seongjong and Yejong, but the production decided to remove any reference to real people, setting the series during the reign of a fictional king and changing the background of the male lead.

Casting 

On December 17, 2020, Ilgan Sports reported that Park Eun-bin would play the female lead in KBS's new drama The King's Affection. Earlier in the day, the actress' agency, Namoo Actors, declared that she was still considering the offer. On January 15, 2021, Ilgan Sports identified Rowoon as the male lead, but FNC Entertainment stated that for the moment he was focusing on filming She Would Never Know and nothing had been decided.

In the following months, Nam Yoon-su, Choi Byung-chan and Jung Chae-yeon joined the cast; meanwhile Park Eun-bin and Rowoon were confirmed on March 19, 2021. Nam decided to participate in the series to gain new experiences and because he had found the character of Lee Hyun unpredictable, while Rowoon because of the love story told and because he wanted to try his hand in a historical drama.

Park Eun-bin received the script for The King's Affection at a time when she was thinking about acting in a historical drama again, as the last one she filmed was Secret Door in 2014. While aware that there would be other opportunities in the future to fulfill her wish, she decided to take the role because the premise of the series was very attractive and she doubted she would have another chance to play a king. At the press conference before broadcast, Park commented that despite her taking on the role of Lee Hwi with confidence, she had had a hard time making it convincing because it was the first time a woman played a king. Instead of trying to simply disguise herself as a man, she attempted to focus on showing why Hwi had to pretend to be a male and on the moments in which she faced doubts and dangers, as her real side slips out, declaring that she wanted Hwi to be seen as a person regardless of gender. She also took riding lessons and paid attention to adjusting the tone of her voice according to the people around Hwi.

Filming
Filming began in April 2021 and ended on November 15. It was halted on July 26, 2021, as one of the production staff who participated in the July 24 filming was tested positive for COVID-19. All of the cast members and production staff were subsequently tested and went into self-quarantine on the same day. On July 27, it was announced that Park Eun-bin, Lee Pil-mo and Bae Soo-bin tested negative for COVID-19. On July 28, it was reported that Nam Yoon-su test result was also negative, and filming resumed on the same day.

On August 6, it was revealed that filming was cancelled due to a fire that broke out a day earlier, at 21:10 KST, when the crew was filming at the Korean Folk Village in Yongin, Gyeonggi Province. The fire was extinguished by firefighters within 20 minutes.

Filming locations also include Hangae Village in Seongju County and Hanjujeongsa Temple on its summit; Gyeonggijeon Temple, its hyanggyo (provincial school) and hanok village in Jeonju, Munheon Confucian school in Seocheon County, Mungyeong Saejae provincial park in Mungyeong, Buan Cinema Theme Park, Itaesarang rock in Geochang, Manhyujeong pavilion in Andong, Gwanghalluwon garden in Namwon, and two fortresses, namely Jukjusanseong in Anseong and Sangdangsanseong in Cheongju.

Original soundtrack

Part 1

Part 2

Part 3

Part 4

Part 5

Part 6

Part 7

Reception

Critical reception 
Overall, The King's Affection was well received by critics, both in South Korea and abroad. Several outlets felt that it opened a new horizon in the stories of women disguised as men, and that Hwi's independence and how she repeatedly saved Ji-woon constituted a 180° shift in the gender roles of a typical romantic series, appreciating "the rare attempt" to make the female lead occupy a higher social position, instead of recounting the sad love between a high-ranking man and a woman of humble origins, and observing that the concept of the woman who pretends to be a man transcends the dimension of melodrama, extending towards the dimension of battles for values and self-affirmation, and comparing it to the struggles against prejudice fought by minorities excluded for their diversity.

Calling the drama "interesting and different" from previous series in which the female lead wore male clothes, such as Coffee Prince, Sungkyungwan Scandal or Love in the Moonlight, the Thai news agency Workpoint Today noted that the fact that the hero fell in love regardless of the other person's gender could be considered an attempt to help normalize boundless love, blurring the lines between femininity and masculinity still deeply rooted in South Korean society, and appreciated the absence of the classic scene in which the male lead wonders why he likes a person of the same sex. Through the revival of stereotypical scenes, but in which Ji-woon adopts behaviors usually attributed to female characters, and through the debates on Confucius' teachings, it also identified the desire to shatter the distinction between male and female roles particularly clear in historical series, and the conviction that traditional beliefs should no longer define sexuality. AlloCiné found that the intonation is evocative of Mulan, but observed that the series stood out for its very light plot, and narrated the sentimental wanderings of a young woman in a fundamentally patriarchal environment, calling it "feminist in more than one way". In general, critics appreciated the more open vision of love presented by the series, considering it more daring than previous historical dramas with the same concept given the greater presence of queer elements, not only in the BL relationship between Hwi and Ji-woon, but also in the GL one between Hwi and Ha-kyung.

Compliments were also directed to the aesthetics of the sets and costumes, and to the interpretations of the protagonists, especially to the performances of Choi Myung-bin in the roles of both Dam-yi and her brother Hwi as children, and to the more nuanced one by Park Eun-bin, whose complete identification with the character was considered one of the main reasons for the popularity of the series. Moreover, the drama attracted positive comments for the portrayal of youth fighting against the status quo in order to protect their rights and happiness, freely expressing, in an imaginary world, metaphors of reality and social taboos that are difficult to manage in a series set in modern times, for example the older generation's attempt to arbitrarily define and classify young people according to its own desires: in particular, Han Ki-jae's ambition to wield power by maneuvering Hwi like a puppet evoked the election campaign for the new President of South Korea and the way in which the political community incited young people to vote.

Popular culture critic Jung Deok-hyun noted, however, that while it might have been possible for a crown prince to fall in love with a eunuch, seeing Ji-woon courting Hwi was disconcerting, as, taking into account Joseon's power structure and discrimination between men and women at the time, it would have been more common to witness the opposite, considering Hwi's position of greater power; consequently, he found the dynamics between the two characters implausible, also due to the fact that Ji-woon ignored Hwi's true gender, and observed that, if the relationship had been treated with greater seriousness and foresight, it could have become a true queer drama, especially if the production decided to opt for the story of a true homosexual love. However, he noted that it was a "strangely exciting" drama, probably because of the love story that transcends hierarchy and gender, and that, despite the ridiculous situations and the low plausibility, it had managed to capture the audience by making them believe that such a story could actually take place.

On the other side, Tae Yoo-na of Hankyung found the development sloppy, characters awkward, and casting wrong, arguing that Park Eun-bin's physique and height were too small compared to Rowoon's, preventing her from expressing the dignity of a crown prince. Stephen McCarty of the South China Morning Post noted that the series could have cut some bloodshed without losing narrative strength.

The King's Affection placed sixth on NME's best Korean dramas of 2021 list.

Viewership 
According to Nielsen Korea, The King's Affection debuted in South Korea with a national average share of 6.2%. Episode 6 scored the lowest ratings for the series, with a national average share of 5.5% and 4.8% in the Seoul metropolitan area, but after the conclusion of Lovers of the Red Sky, one of the competing programs of the evening, episode 7 recorded the best ratings for the drama, which reached a share of 10% with episode 13 and ended with 12,1%.

In the span of two weeks, The King's Affection entered the top 10 of Netflix's most viewed programs globally and the top 5 in Hong Kong, Indonesia, Japan, Malaysia, Philippines, Singapore, Thailand and Vietnam. Following the release of episodes 9 and 10 on November 10, it ranked eighth globally, and first among the most viewed Korean programs for three consecutive days, while on November 23 it was fourth in Netflix's Global Top 10 (Non-English), with 15.64 million hours watched.

Awards and nominations

Listicle

Notes

References

External links
  
 
 
 
 

Korean Broadcasting System television dramas
Korean-language television shows
South Korean historical television series
South Korean romance television series
Television series set in the Joseon dynasty
Television series by Monster Union
Television series by Story Hunter Production
2021 South Korean television series debuts
2021 South Korean television series endings
Korean-language Netflix exclusive international distribution programming